The Herald and Post is the name given to various weekly freesheets that deliver to households in much of the United Kingdom. The title is published by a variety of publishers; each edition consisting mainly of advertising and promotional pieces, with news items often sourced from sister publications. In particular, it may refer to:
Edinburgh Herald and Post
Fife Herald & Post
Northampton Herald & Post
Northumberland Herald and Post
Perth Herald & Post
Peterborough Herald and Post
Herald and Post (Teesside)
West Lothian Herald & Post